The 2017 Dynamic Austria Open, was the third Euro Tour 9-Ball pool event in 2017. The event was won by Austria's Mario He who defeated Spain's Francisco Sánchez Ruíz 9–2 in the final.

Tournament format
The event saw a total of 162 players compete, in a double-elimination knockout tournament, until the last 32 stage; where the tournament was contested as single elimination.

Prize fund

Tournament results

References

External links

Euro Tour
Sporting events in Austria
2017 Euro Tour events